Cracks is a 2009 British independent psychological thriller-drama film directed by Jordan Scott, starring Eva Green, Juno Temple, María Valverde, and Imogen Poots. It was released theatrically in the United Kingdom and Ireland on 4 December 2009. In the United States, it was released by IFC Films theatrically on 18 March 2011 and premiered on television on Showtime as part of an ongoing pay television broadcast deal with IFC later in the year.

The film was produced in May 2008, written for the screen by Caroline Ip, Ben Court and Jordan Scott, based on the 1999 novel written by Sheila Kohler. Kwesi Dickson, Andrew Lowe, Julie Payne, Rosalie Swedlin and Christine Vachon were the producers. Ridley and Tony Scott served as executive producers. The film was mostly filmed in County Wicklow, Ireland.

Plot
Set in the 1930s in a strict elite British boarding school called St Mathilda's, the story centres on a clique of girls who idolise their enigmatic diving instructor, Miss G (Eva Green) (in the film, we learn that Miss G had been a student at the same school where she now works and may even have continued on at the school after she graduated). Di Radfield (Juno Temple) has a crush on Miss G, and is the firm favourite and ringleader of her group. When a beautiful Spanish girl named Fiamma Corona (María Valverde) arrives at the school, Miss G's focus is shifted away from the other girls. It becomes a triangle: Miss G gets increasingly obsessed with Fiamma, Fiamma is disturbed by Miss G and also openly disgusted by the teacher's hypocrisies and deceptions, and Di is terribly jealous and makes Fiamma's life hell.

Miss G (who claims to be a world traveller) goes to a nearby parochial town to buy some provisions. She  draws the unwanted attention of some local louts and is visibly upset and in a near-panic when she returns to the school.

The bullying culminates in Di physically throwing Fiamma out of the school but, unable to return to Spain as she hoped, Fiamma returns later that night.

Di and Fiamma begin to develop a friendship. Fiamma faints at a dorm party, and Miss G takes her to her own room, where she rapes her while she is passed out. Di witnesses this and flees.

The next morning, Fiamma is visibly upset, and Miss G is equally distressed as she runs around after her. Di is broody, and eventually tells the rest of her gang that Fiamma seduced Miss G. Fiamma presumably tells Miss G that she will report the molestation to the teachers, and horrified, Miss G realises her career will be over. She in turn manipulates Di's affection for her into anger. She says that Fiamma will make up lies about her molesting her (even though it was true) and plans to get her kicked out of school. Di absolutely refuses to allow this to happen.

The confrontation between Di's gang and Fiamma turns ugly as Fiamma declines to answer Di's vicious questions and tries to explain what really happened, hinting at Miss G's lies and character defects. Fiamma runs into the forest as things become more violent, but the girls catch up with her and, under Di's leadership, beat her with their sticks and fists. Fiamma starts to have an asthma attack, and the girls stop, terrified. They run to get help, and Di runs into Miss G (who had been watching the beating and the chase that ensued quietly and with no attempt to stop the beating), who says she'll stay with Fiamma, and directs Di to go get a teacher.

In the forest, Miss G, alone with Fiamma, refuses to give Fiamma her inhaler and calmly watches her die. Di returns just in time to see Miss G placing the inhaler in Fiamma's lifeless hand, realizing the truth.

Later, Di tells the other girls what happened, and, united, they confront Miss G. They are powerless officially, but they quit the diving team and symbolically turn in their sashes. The headmistress refuses to acknowledge the school's culpability, and seems only concerned with the school's reputation, but releases Miss G from her duties temporarily.

The final scene has Di leaving the school to explore the world, as both Fiamma and Miss G had spoken of doing, whilst Miss G goes to the local village and finds a small room she can live in, showing that all her tales of her travels have indeed been fake like Fiamma had told Di and she has been, perhaps, habiting this small room instead. In a scene that perhaps allows the viewer a better understanding of Miss G's personality, we see her put her few personal possessions on her bedside table. She puts one item there and then quickly removes it to make room for another item. After that, she counts the items to make sure that there are only five. The viewer is then reminded that when Fiamma arrived at the school, in the dorm room, Di had told her that only five personal items could be displayed on her night table at one time.

Cast

 Eva Green as Miss "G" Gribben
 Juno Temple as Di Radfield
 Maria Valverde as Fiamma Coronna
 Imogen Poots as Poppy
 Zoë Carroll as Rosie
 Ellie Nunn as Lily
 Adele McCann as Laurel
 Clemmie Dugdale as Fuzzy
 Sinéad Cusack as Miss Nieven
 Deirdre Donnelly as Miss Lacey

Reception
Cracks received a mixed reception from critics. The site's critical consensus reads, "Atomospheric but not much else, Cracks is a formless film in search of compelling drama." On Metacritic, the film has a score of 54 out of 100 based on 12 critic reviews.

See also
 The Prime of Miss Jean Brodie
 Notes on a Scandal

References

Further reading

External links
 
 
 
 
  Cracks at Lumiere
 

2009 films
2000s thriller drama films
American psychological thriller films
LGBT-related thriller drama films
British thriller drama films
British LGBT-related films
British independent films
Irish LGBT-related films
2000s English-language films
Films set in boarding schools
2009 LGBT-related films
Films about scandalous teacher–student relationships
Lesbian-related films
Films based on American novels
Films set in England
Films set in the 1930s
Films shot in County Wicklow
Films produced by Christine Vachon
Films based on horror novels
Films scored by Javier Navarrete
Irish thriller films
Killer Films films
Scott Free Productions films
British thriller films
2009 directorial debut films
2009 drama films
Films about rape
Films about pedophilia
2009 thriller films
English-language French films
English-language Spanish films
English-language Irish films
2000s American films
2000s British films